Tàladh Chrìosda (Christ's lullaby) is the popular name for the Scottish Gaelic Christmas carol Tàladh ar Slànaigheir (the Lullaby of our Saviour).  It is traditionally sung at Midnight Mass in the Outer Hebrides in Scotland.  The 29 verses of the hymn date from the 19th century and are intended to represent a lullaby for the Christ Child by the Blessed Virgin.

The song was popularised among English speakers in the early 20th century by Marjory Kennedy-Fraser under the title The Christ-Child's Lullaby.

Lyricist
The words are believed to have been written by Fr. Ranald Rankin, a Roman Catholic priest from Fort William, Scotland shortly before he emigrated to Australia and became a missionary at Little River, Victoria. The hymn was originally titled Tàladh ar Slànuighear (the Lullaby of our Saviour) and sung to a tune called Cumha Mhic Àrois (the Lament for Mac Àrois).

The lyric appears as item 10 in the University of Glasgow Library's Bàrd na Ceapaich manuscript where it is entitled Taladh ar Slanuighir (Cuimhneachan do Chloinn Mhuideart) which can be translated as Our Saviour's Lullaby (Memento to the Children of Moidart).  The same manuscript again gives the title for the tune as Cumha Mhic Arois (Lament for Mac Àrois) and supplies the same information regarding the author of the lyric and, presumably, date of publication – An t-Urramach Raonall Mac Raing.  An t-8mh Mios, 1855 (Fr. Ronald Rankin, August 1855).

Donald MacLean's Typographia Scoto-Gadelica (1915) p329 documents the first publication of the hymn as follows.

RANKIN (Rev. RONALD, R.C), THE SAVIOUR'S LULLABY. 1855. "Taladh Ar Slanuighear. Air Fonn 'Cumha Mhic Arois'" and at the end "Cuimhneachan do Chloinn Mhuideart bho Raonall Mac-Raing. An T-8mh Mios. 1855."' 12mo. 4 pp. These copies were circulated among the Parishioners on the emigration of the Author to Australia.

Fr. Rankin was documented by the succeeding parish priest, Fr. Hugh Chisholm, as having served the parish of Moidart between 1838 and 25 July 1855.  It is therefore possible that the hymn was composed before the latter date.

In his Moidart: Among the Clanranalds, Fr. Charles Macdonald writes that Father Rankin was "an outspoken advocate in behalf of emigration." Living during the Highland Clearances and the Highland Potato Famine, Fr. Rankin believed that leaving Scotland was the only way for his parishioners to escape the dire poverty under which they lived due to both excessive rents and the constant threat of eviction by Anglo-Scottish landlords. Fr. Rankin therefore urged them to depart for Australia in an assisted emigration scheme and promised that he would soon follow.

Fr. Rankin sailed from Scotland on the James Baines to Australia and, in 1857, he was made parish priest of St Michael's Roman Catholic Church in Little River, near Geelong, State of Victoria. Fr. Rankin died there in 1863.

Tune
"Mac Fir Àrois" (the son of the Man of Aros) – i.e., an heir of Aros in the Isle of Mull in Scotland – is traditionally held to have drowned in Loch Friosa (Loch Frisa) in Mull.  The Rev. John Gregorson Campbell, in his Superstitions of the Highlands of Scotland, pp205–206, states the following.

The heir of Aros, a young man of great personal activity, and, it is said, of dissolute manners, having an opinion of himself that there was no horse he could not ride, was taken by a water-horse into Loch Frisa, a small lake about a mile in length in the north-west of Mull and devoured. This occurred between his espousal and marriage, and the Lament composed by his intended bride is still and deservedly a popular song in Mull. There seems to be this much truth in the story, that the young man was dragged into Loch Frisa by a mare which he was attempting to subdue and drowned. It would appear from the song that his body was recovered.

However, 'Mhic Àrois' appears to be a garbling of a term like 'mac Fir Àrasaig' (son of the Man of Arisaig).  The medieval title 'Fear Àrasaig (Man of Arisaig) belonged to Clan Mackintosh.  In p168 of An Gaidheal Vol II (1873), Donald C MacPherson wrote the words for what he titled 'Cumha Mhic a Arois.  No Cumha Mhic-an-Tòisich.' (the Lament for the Son of a-Arois.  Or the Lament for Mackintosh.) The lyric he provides is a variant of the lyric for Cumha Mhic an Tòisich but contains a line 'Dheagh mhic a Arois' (Good son of a-Arois).

The tune of Tàladh ar Slànaigheir bears similarities to the group of songs related to the pipe lament Cumha Mhic an Tòisich (Mackintosh's Lament), which has another alternative title of Cumha Mhic Rìgh Aro (Lament for the Son of the King of Aro).  However, these similarities are only in general melodic structure and poetic metre, but not in musical mode or scale.  It is therefore possible that the tune used in the Outer Hebrides for Tàladh ar Slànaigheir is a substitute related melody.

In the article The Sources of the Gaelic Hymnal 1893 in The Innes Review Vol. VII (1956) at p108, John Lorne Campbell states the following concerning the melody of Tàladh ar Slànaigheir, which has survived only in the Outer Hebrides.

The tune is said to be "Cumha Mhic Arois" in all these early printed sources, but the hymn is now sung to an air which appears to be derived from the chorus of an old waulking song.

In p155 of Folksongs and Folklore of South Uist (1986), the waulking song concerned is identified by Margaret Fay Shawas An cuala sibh mar dh'éirich dhòmhs' .  Recordings exist of two versions of the tune for this.

The variants of the tune of Tàladh ar Slànaigheir differ in mode from each other in a similar fashion to variants of the song Chaidh mo Dhunnchadh dhan Bheinn (my Duncan went to the hill).  In the case of both songs, the major third of the scale is weakened in one melodic variant and strengthened in another.

Lyrics

Scottish Gaelic
The following text is the version published by the Chief of Clan Chisholm, Colin Chisholm (1806–1896), in the Transactions of the Gaelic Society of Inverness Vol XV (1888–89), pp239–242.

See also
 List of Christmas carols

References

Video footage
Fiona J. MacKenzie's Rendition
The Rankin Sisters' Rendition
Meredith Hall and Le Nef, Montreal, 2004

External links
Alan Lomax Research Center
Alan Lomax Research Center (Continued)
An cuala sibh mar dh'éirich dhòmhs'  sung an octave up
An cuala sibh mar dh'éirich dhòmhs'  sung an octave down

19th-century hymns
19th century in Scotland
Christ Child
Christmas carols
Christmas in Scotland
Scottish Christian hymns
Scottish folk songs
Scottish Gaelic music
Scottish Gaelic poems
Scottish songs